George Nicolls (1884 – 11 May 1942) was an Irish politician and solicitor. In the lead-up to the 1916 Easter Rising, a rebel plan for Galway town was prepared at Nicolls' home at 2 University Road. He was arrested in Galway on Easter Tuesday before the local Irish Volunteers could be mobilised. He spent most of the period from 1916 to 1921 in prison in England. 

He was first elected unopposed at the 1921 elections for the Galway constituency as a Sinn Féin Teachta Dála (TD) to the 2nd Dáil while still imprisoned. In January 1922, he was appointed Assistant Minister for Home Affairs in the Government of the 2nd Dáil.

Following the Anglo-Irish Treaty, he sided with Michael Collins and voted in favour of it. He was re-elected at the 1922 general election as a pro-Treaty Sinn Féin TD. At the 1923 general election, he was re-elected as a Cumann na nGaedheal TD. In the 4th Dáil, he was appointed as Parliamentary Secretary to the Minister for Defence and served from January 1925 to May 1927. He did not stand at the June 1927 general election.

Nicolls was married in Dublin in December 1914 to Margaret MacHugh.

References

Intelligence files

External links

1884 births
1942 deaths
Early Sinn Féin TDs
Cumann na nGaedheal TDs
Members of the 2nd Dáil
Members of the 3rd Dáil
Members of the 4th Dáil
Politicians from County Galway
Irish solicitors
Parliamentary Secretaries of the 4th Dáil
People of the Irish Civil War (Pro-Treaty side)